Trimedoxime bromide (INN), also known as dipyroxime or TMB-4, is an oxime used in the treatment of organophosphate poisoning It is chemically related to pralidoxime.

References

Cholinesterase reactivators
Chemical substances for emergency medicine
Aldoximes
Pyridinium compounds